Antonio "Toni" Carbognani (born 5 November 1953) is an Argentine retired professional footballer who played as a midfielder for the New York Cosmos and the Memphis Rogues in the NASL. He later managed the Memphis Express of the USL Premier Development League.

Player
Carbognani started his playing career with San Telmo in 1975. In 1976, he was sold to Barcelona Sporting Club of Ecuador. In 1979, he was signed by New York Cosmos of the North American Soccer League. In the fall of 1979, the Cosmos sent him to the Memphis Rogues in time for the NASL indoor season. He then played the 1980 outdoor season for the Rogues. In the fall of 1981, Carbognani signed with the Memphis Americans of the Major Indoor Soccer League. In 1983, he played for the Jacksonville Tea Men of the American Soccer League. In 1984, the Memphis Americans moved to Las Vegas, Nevada where the team spent the 1984–1985 MISL season as the Las Vegas Americans. The team folded at the end of the season and the league declared Carbognani to be a free agent. He then signed with the Baltimore Blast. The Blast released him at the end of the season and Carbognani moved to the Memphis Storm of the American Indoor Soccer Association. The team changed its name to the Rogues before the 1989–1990 season. That year, Carbognani both played and coached the team. In 1990, he moved to the Chicago Power. The AISA had also changed its name to the National Professional Soccer League. In 1991, he was back with the Rogues who were now playing in the Southwest Independent Soccer League. In the fall of 1991, the Rogues were renamed the Memphis Survivors and they played in the USISL indoor league. He may not have played again until the summer of 1994 when he was on the Memphis Jackals roster.

Coach
In the fall of 1988, the Memphis Storm elevated Carbognani to the position of player-head coach. At the end of the season, they replaced him with Don Tobin and Carbognani continued as a player only. In December 1989, Carbognani replaced Don Tobin the head coach.

References

External links
 Soy del Telmo profile
 BDFA profile
NASL/MISL career stats

1953 births
Living people
Footballers from Buenos Aires
American Indoor Soccer Association coaches
American Indoor Soccer Association players
American Soccer League (1933–1983) players
Argentine footballers
Argentine football managers
Baltimore Blast (1980–1992) players
Barcelona S.C. footballers
Chicago Power players
Expatriate footballers in Ecuador
Expatriate soccer players in the United States
Jacksonville Tea Men players
Las Vegas Americans players
Major Indoor Soccer League (1978–1992) players
Memphis Americans players
Memphis Rogues players
Memphis Storm players
National Professional Soccer League (1984–2001) players
North American Soccer League (1968–1984) indoor players
New York Cosmos players
North American Soccer League (1968–1984) players
USISL players
Association football midfielders